Ugashik may refer to:

 Ugashik, Alaska
 Ugashik Bay